Labourse is a commune in the Pas-de-Calais department in the Hauts-de-France region of France.

Geography
The commune is also traversed by the A26 autoroute.

Population

Places of interest
 A nineteenth-century chateau.
 The church of St. Martin, rebuilt in the 16th century.
 The chapel, rebuilt, along with most of the village, after World War I.
 A museum, telling of the deportations of World War II.

See also
Communes of the Pas-de-Calais department

References

External links

 The CWGC graves in the communal cemetery

Communes of Pas-de-Calais